A consumer complaint or customer complaint is "an expression of dissatisfaction on a consumer's behalf to a responsible party" (London, 1980). It can also be described in a positive sense as a report from a consumer providing documentation about a problem with a product or service.

Consumer complaints are usually informal complaints directly addressed to a company or public service provider, and most consumers manage to resolve problems with products and services  but it sometimes requires persistence.  An instrumental complaint is a complaint made to a person or organization that could take some action and bring about a specific remedy.  An expressive complaint is a complaint made for the purpose of expressing feelings, without any realistic chance of anything being done.  Most online complaints are expressive complaints.

Identifying a Consumer Complaint 
Consumer complaints have three main characteristics: they are goal-oriented, there are multiple ways of engaging in this behavior, and are used to complain in several ways. A definitive characteristic of a consumer complaint is to achieve a goal that the consumer views as needing improvement. Although, there is no certainty of the goal being attained. Factors that would disrupt the process of a successful goal include: the distributor of the product may not be able to provide, or the company may lack the time or resources to address the complaint. The second characteristic is that the consumer will engage in multiple forms of complaint. Examples include: complaining directly to the company or a representative, expressing opinions to friends and family, and sending correspondence to an agency such as the Better Business Bureau. Consequently, the third unique characteristic of a consumer complaint can be identified if the consumer complains in multiple ways.

Complaining to agencies 
If the grievance is not addressed in a way that satisfies the consumer, the consumer sometimes registers the complaint with a third party such as the Better Business Bureau, a local or regional government (if it has a "consumer protection" office) and Federal Trade Commission (in the United States). These and similar organizations in other countries accept for consumer complaints and assist people with customer service issues, as do government representatives like attorneys general. Consumers however rarely file complaints in the more formal legal sense, which consists of a formal legal process (see the article on complaint).

In some countries (for example Australia, the United Kingdom, and many countries of the European Community), the making of consumer complaints, particularly regarding the sale of financial services, is governed by statute (law). The statutory authority may require companies to reply to complaints within set time limits, publish written procedures for handling customer dissatisfaction, and provide information about arbitration schemes.

Complaining online 
Internet forums and the advent of social media have provided consumers with a new way to submit complaints. Consumer news and advocacy websites often accept and publish complaints. Publishing complaints on highly visible websites increases the likelihood that the general public will become aware of the consumer's complaint. If, for example, a person with many "followers" or "friends" publishes a complaint on social media, it may go "viral".  Internet forums in general and on complaint websites have made it possible for individual consumers to hold large corporations accountable in a public forum.

See also
 Airline complaints
 Better Business Bureau
 Consumer protection
 Consumer organization
 Federal Trade Commission
 Ombudsman

References

Consumer behaviour
Legal terminology
Legal documents
Customer experience